Samuel Doody (1656–1706) was an early English botanist.

Life
The eldest of the second family of his father, John Doody, an apothecary in Staffordshire who later moved to London where he had a shop in The Strand, he was born in Staffordshire 28 May 1656. He went into his father's business, to which he succeeded about 1696.

He undertook the care of the Apothecaries' Garden at Chelsea in 1693, at a salary of £100, which he seems to have continued until his death. Two years later he was elected Fellow of the Royal Society. He died, after some weeks' illness, the last week in November 1706, and was buried at Hampstead 3 December, his funeral sermon being preached by his friend Adam Buddle.

Works
His sole contribution as an author seems to be a paper in the Philosophical Transactions (1697), xix. 390, on a case of dropsy in the breast. He had given some attention to botany before 1687, the date of a commonplace book, but his help is first acknowledged by John Ray in 1688 in the second volume of the Historia Plantarum. He was intimate with the botanists of his time: Ray, Leonard Plukenet, James Petiver, and Hans Sloane. He devoted himself to cryptogams, at that time very little studied, and became an authority on them. The results of his herborisations around London were recorded in his copy of Ray's ‘Synopsis,’ 2nd edit., now in the British Museum, and were used by Dillenius in preparing the third edition.

References

Attribution

1656 births
1706 deaths
17th-century English botanists
Fellows of the Royal Society
English apothecaries
18th-century British botanists